Paula Parisi (born ) is a retired Argentine female volleyball player. She was part of the Argentina women's national volleyball team.

She participated in the 2003 FIVB Volleyball World Grand Prix.
On club level she played for GELP, ARG in 2003.

References

External links
 Profile at FIVB.org

1967 births
Living people
Argentine women's volleyball players
Place of birth missing (living people)